Edward Greaves may refer to:
 Edward Greaves (Australian politician) (1910–1964), member of the New South Wales Legislative Assembly 
 Edward Greaves (MP) (1803–1879), English banker and Conservative politician
 Sir Edward Greaves, 1st Baronet (1608–1680), English royal physician
 Edward Evelyn Greaves (born 1940), High Commissioner of Barbados to Canada